Precious Lord is a gospel album by Al Green, released in 1982.

Critical reception
Robert Christgau thought that "the Memphis groove of Al's first two Myrrh albums had somehow turned into rote tent-gospel timekeeping."

Track listing
"Precious Lord" (Thomas A. Dorsey) - 3:12
"What a Friend We Have in Jesus" - 4:15
"The Old Rugged Cross" - 3:27
"Morningstar" (Moses Dillard, Sharon Michalsky) - 3:26
"How Great Thou Art" - 3:34
"Glory To His Name" - 2:57
"Rock of Ages" - 2:35
"In the Garden" - 3:59
"Hallelujah (I Just Want to Praise the Lord)" (Al Green, Moses Dillard) - 4:40

Personnel 
 Al Green – lead vocals, arrangements (2, 6, 7)
 David Briggs – keyboards 
 Tony Brown – keyboards 
 Kenny Bell – guitars 
 Moses Dillard – guitars 
 Bob Wray – bass
 Larrie Londin – drums 
 Jerry Peters – horn and string arrangements 
 The Nashville Hornworks – horns
 The "A" Strings – strings 
 Anita Ball – backing vocals
 Francine Belcher – backing vocals
 Lea Jane Berinati – backing vocals 
 Kim Fleming – backing vocals 
 Vicki Hampton – backing vocals 
 Bobby Jones – backing vocals
 Donna McElroy – backing vocals 
 Temple Riser – backing vocals
 Karen Taylor – backing vocals

Production 
 Al Green – producer 
 Bill Cantrell – associate producer 
 Quinton Claunch – associate producer
 Billy Sherrill – engineer, mixing 
 Hank Williams – mastering at Woodland Studios (Nashville, Tennessee)
 Alan Messer – photography

References

Al Green albums
1982 albums
Gospel albums by American artists